Stephanie De Groof (born 29 May 1991, Antwerp) is a Belgian field hockey player. At the 2012 Summer Olympics she competed with the Belgium women's national field hockey team in the women's tournament.  She played for KHC Dragons.

References

External links 

 

Living people
1991 births
Field hockey players at the 2012 Summer Olympics
Olympic field hockey players of Belgium
Belgian female field hockey players
KHC Dragons players

Sportspeople from Antwerp